Netaji Bhawan or Netaji Bhavan is a heritage building in Kolkata, West Bengal, maintained as a memorial and research center to the life of the Indian nationalist "Netaji" Subhas Chandra Bose. It is currently the headquarters of Netaji Research Bureau.

History
The house, built by Bose's father in 1909, is owned and managed by the Netaji Research Bureau and includes a museum, archives and library. The Bureau is run by Sugata Bose and his mother, Krishna Bose. The building is on Lala Lajpat Rai Sarani in Kolkata.

Bose escaped from house arrest at Netaji Bhawan in 1941 and fled to Berlin. After that, he traveled to Japan-occupied Southeast Asia by submarine (German U-boat  and ), organized Indian National Army, and fought against British Raj with the Imperial Japanese Army. 

Relics of Bose's footprints are exhibited in the museum.

After the Second World War, Mohandas K. Gandhi and Jawaharlal Nehru visited Netaji Bhawan. 

Recently, in 2007, Prime Minister of Japan Shinzō Abe visited the Netaji Bhawan.

External links 
 Netaji Research Bureau

References

Museums in Kolkata
Monuments and memorials in Kolkata
Memorials to Subhas Chandra Bose
Museums established in 1957
Biographical museums in India